ISO 26000:2010 Guidance on social responsibility is an international standard providing guidelines for social responsibility (SR, often CSR - corporate social responsibility). An organization's relationship with the society and the environment in which it operates is a critical factor in their ability to continue operating effectively. This standard is used as a measure for an organization's performance as it provides guidance on how it should operate in socially responsible way. It was released by the International Organization for Standardization on 1 November 2010 and its goal is to contribute to global sustainable development by encouraging business and other organizations to practice social responsibility to improve their impacts on their workers, their natural environments and their communities.

This standard was developed by ISO/TMBG Technical Management Board - groups.

Structure
The structure of ISO 26000 is as follows:
Scope
Terms and definitions
Understanding social responsibility
Principles of social responsibility
Recognizing social responsibility and engaging stakeholders
Guidance on social responsibility core subjects
Guidance on integrating social responsibility throughout an organization.

Voluntary Guidance Standard for All Organizations
ISO 26000 offers guidance on socially responsible behavior and possible actions. There are three ways in which it is different from the more widespread standards designed for companies to use to meet particular requirements for activities such as manufacturing, managing, accounting and reporting: 
ISO 26000 is a voluntary guidance standard: it does not contain requirements such as those used when a standard is offered for "certification". There is a certain learning curve associated with using ISO 26000, because there is no specific external reward - certification - explicitly tied to ISO 26000. ISO recommends that users say, for example, that they have "used ISO 26000 as a guide to integrate social responsibility into our values and practices".
ISO 26000 is designed for use by all organizations, not only businesses and corporations. Organizations such as hospitals and schools, charities (not-for-profits), etc. are also included. ISO 26000 makes particular efforts to show that its flexibility means that it can be applied by small businesses and other groups as well  So far, many of the earliest users of ISO 26000 have been multi-national corporations, especially those based in Europe, and East Asia, particularly Japan.
ISO 26000 was developed through a multi-stakeholder process, meeting in eight Working Group Plenary Sessions between 2005 and 2010, with additional committee meetings and consultations on e-mail throughout the five-year process. Approximately five hundred delegates participated in this process, drawn from six stakeholder groups: Industry, Government, NGO (non-governmental organization), Labour, Consumer, and SSRO (Service, Support, Research and Others - primarily academics and consultants). Leadership of various task groups and committees was "twinned" between "developing" and "developed" countries, to ensure viewpoints from different economic and cultural contexts. Since ISO operates on a parliamentary procedure form based on consensus, the final agreed-on standard was the result of deliberation and negotiations; no one group was able to block it, but also no one group was able to achieve its objectives when others strongly disagreed. The goal was to make ISO 26000 accessible and usable by all organizations, in different countries, precisely because it reflects the goals and concerns of each and all of the stakeholder groups in its final compromise form.

Key Principles and Core Subjects of ISO 26000
The Seven Key Principles, advocated as the roots of socially responsible behavior, are:
 Accountability
 Transparency
 Ethical behavior
 Respect for stakeholder interests (stakeholders are individuals or groups who are affected by, or have the ability to impact, the organization's actions)
 Respect for the rule of law
 Respect for international norms of behavior
 Respect for human rights

The Seven Core Subjects, which every user of ISO 26000 should consider, are: 
 Organizational governance
 Human rights
 Labor practices
 Environment
 Fair operating practices
 Consumer issues
 Community involvement and development

Many of the 84 pages of the standard are devoted to definitions, examples, and suggestions on how to identify and communicate with stakeholders, and how to identify and address specific issues in each Core Subject area.

To Obtain a Copy of ISO 26000
ISO 26000 is available for sale by National Standards Bodies in many countries.  Prices are set by the different National Standards Bodies, and vary widely. ISO 26000 is available in many national and international languages, including Arabic, Bulgarian, Czech, Dutch, English, French, German, Indonesian, Italian, Japanese, Kazakh, Korean, Montenegrin, Norwegian, Polish, Portuguese, Romanian, Russian, Serbian, Slovak, Spanish, Swedish, Thai, Vietnamese. ISO 26000 is copyrighted by ISO. See the ISO webpage at http://www.iso.org for more information.

User Guides to ISO 26000
There is a growing number of user guides, many of which are significantly less expensive than the standard itself. Quality and applicability of these guides will vary widely. An assessment tool has been worked out e.g. by The Royal Norwegian Society for Development (Norges Vel), supported by the Asociatia Pentru Implementarea Democratiei (AID -Romania). The ISO's International Workshop Agreement IWA 26:2017 provides guidance on "using ISO 26000:2010 in management systems".

Additional information and critiques

The ISO 26000 Scope states "This International Standard is not a management system standard. It is not intended or appropriate for certification purposes or regulatory or contractual use. Any offer to certify, or claims to be certified, to ISO 26000 would be a misrepresentation of the intent and purpose and a misuse of this International Standard. As this International Standard does not contain requirements, any such certification would not be a demonstration of conformity with this International Standard."  This statement includes that ISO 26000 cannot be used as basis for audits, conformity tests and certificates, or for any other kind of compliance statements.  It can however be used as a statement of intention by the CEO and this is seen as its main value.

The practical value of ISO 26000 has been debated. It might be limited if it merely provided a common understanding of social responsibility instead of also facilitating management routines and practices leading to social responsibility. Despite the non-certifiability, some scholars see distinct elements of a management system standard also in ISO 26000. Against this background, the potential benefits of the new standard, the managerial relevance, and specific limitations of ISO 26000 are currently being discussed. Critiques include the lack of any certification, the potential to "decouple" and isolate corporate social responsibility issues in an organization (Schwarz & Tilling 2009), the difficulty for smaller organizations to access the 100-plus-page "textbook" form of the standard, and the fact that the best practices represented by the standard tend to age; to address at least this last concern, interested parties are tracking the need and timing of a possible update. There is also a concern that ISO 26000 is just one among "too many" social impact reporting standards available to corporations.

As a guidance document the ISO 26000 is an offer, voluntary in use, and encourages organizations to discuss their social responsibility issues and possible actions with relevant stakeholders. As service providers, certification bodies do not belong to an organization's stakeholders.
ISO 26000 encourages its users to reconsider an organization's social responsibility or "socially responsible behaviour" and to identify/select from its recommendations those where the organization could/should engage in contributions to society. ISO 26000 encourages its users to report to their stakeholders, and get feedback, on actions taken to  improve their social responsibility.

It is this identification of "stakeholders" that makes the ISO 26000 an important step forward in solving the dilemma presented by corporations still in pursuit of single bottom line accountability, moving the discussion beyond Triple Bottom Line Accountability. It is also an important step in the development of business-led social responsibility initiatives which evidence suggests is much more effective than government-regulated social responsibly policies.

Project aim
There is a range of many different opinions as to the right approach to ethical and socially responsible behavior by businesses, ranging from strict legislation at one end to complete freedom at the other. ISO 26000 is looking for a golden middle way that promotes respect and responsibility based on known reference documents without stifling creativity and development. ISO (established 1947 to promote international trade by developing manufacturing standards) is now composed of 162 members, each of which is a National Standards Board of a particular country. ISO's expansion into the field of Social Responsibility (Corporate Social Responsibility) was driven by many factors, including a recognition that the pace of global development calls for increasing actions by organizations, including businesses, to reduce their harmful impacts on people and communities, and increase their positive impacts.

Development leadership
ISO chose the Swedish Standards Institute (SIS) and  the Brazilian Association of Technical Standards (ABNT) to provide the joint leadership of the ISO Working Group on Social Responsibility (WG SR). The WG SR was given the task of drafting an International Standard for social responsibility that was published in 2010 as ISO 26000.

Target: wide range
The need for organizations in both public and private sectors to behave in a socially responsible way is becoming a generalized requirement of society. It is shared by the stakeholder groups that participated in the WG SR to develop ISO 26000: industry, government, labour, consumers, nongovernmental organizations, and others, in addition to geographical and gender-based balance.
A Memorandum of Understanding was developed between the ISO Group and the United Nations Global Compact in order to both develop and promote the ISO 26000 as the go to Standard for CSR. Unfortunately the United Nations Global Compact did not fulfill its commitment under that MOU nor subsequent commitments to bring the ISO 26000 to the other 90 UN agencies.

See also
 Corporate social responsibility (CSR)
 ISO 14000

References

Further reading

External links
  ISO 26000—Guidance on social responsibility
 ISO TMBG—Technical Management Board - groups
 ASQ What is ISO 26000?
 NORMAPME ISO 26000 User Guide for European SMEs
 ISO 26000 User Guide, IFAN recommended
 ISO 26000 User Guide, in various languages
ISO 26000 Working documents website
Presentation of the ISO26000 project, by SIS Winter/Spring 2006
ISO 26000 Community on LinkedIn
The ISO Working Group on Social Responsibility: developing the future ISO SR 26000 Standard, briefing paper written by Bart Slob and Gerard Oonk
ISO 26000 de Responsabilidad Social Empresarial (español)
Portal de Responsabilidad Social Empresarial de Chile (español)
Blog de la ISO 26000 (español)
Social Responsibility ISO26000 & SA8000

26000
Corporate social responsibility